The William J. Greenman House is a historic home located at Cortland in Cortland County, New York.  It  was built in 1896, and based on a pattern book plan by architect George Franklin Barber. It is a 2½-story, Queen Anne-style frame dwelling.  It is sheathed in clapboard and sits on a stone foundation.  It features exuberant wood trim, decorative shingles and half-timbering; a wraparound porch with a circular section topped by a bell-shaped roof; and projecting bay windows. Also on the property is a contributing carriage house.

It was listed on the National Register of Historic Places in 2011.

References

Houses on the National Register of Historic Places in New York (state)
Queen Anne architecture in New York (state)
Houses completed in 1896
Houses in Cortland County, New York
National Register of Historic Places in Cortland County, New York